Ralph Wetton (6 June 1927 – 2 June 2017) was an English professional footballer who played for Cheshunt, Tottenham Hotspur, Plymouth Argyle and Aldershot.

Playing career
Born in Winlaton, Wetton joined Tottenham Hotspur from non-league Cheshunt in August 1950, where he had been a member of their London League-winning side. Signed as cover for Tottenham and Wales skipper Ron Burgess, he made his senior debut at wing half on 20 October 1951 in a fixture versus Aston Villa when Burgess was injured. He featured in 46 senior appearances in all competitions for the Spurs between 1951 and 1955. Wetton signed for Plymouth Argyle in June 1955 and went on make a further 36 appearances and scoring one goal. After leaving Plymouth he joined Aldershot in November 1956 and scored one goal in 50 matches. He then joined non-league Harlow Town as player-manager before returning to Cheshunt in 1960 where he was also appointed player-manager soon after his arrival. He was sacked at the end of the 1961–62 season after which he became involved in the founding of Brimsdown Rovers where he remained as a committee member for many years after.

Wetton's brother Albert played league football for Brighton & Hove Albion and Crewe Alexandra.

References

1927 births
2017 deaths
People from Winlaton
Footballers from Tyne and Wear
Footballers from County Durham
English footballers
Association football wing halves
Cheshunt F.C. players
Tottenham Hotspur F.C. players
Plymouth Argyle F.C. players
Aldershot F.C. players
Harlow Town F.C. players
English Football League players